The 1960–61 season was the 88th season of competitive football in Scotland and the 64th season of the Scottish Football League.

Scottish League Division One

Champions: Rangers
Relegated: Clyde, Ayr United

Scottish League Division Two

Promoted: Stirling Albion, Falkirk

Cup honours

Other honours

National

County

 – aggregate over two legs

Highland League

Scotland national team

1961 British Home Championship – Third Place

Key:
 (H) = Home match
 (A) = Away match
 WCQG8 = World Cup qualifying – Group 8
 BHC = British Home Championship

Notes and references

External links
Scottish Football Historical Archive

 
Seasons in Scottish football